Teichwitz is a municipality in the district of Greiz, in Thuringia, Germany. The town has a municipal association with Wünschendorf/Elster.

References

Municipalities in Thuringia
Greiz (district)
Grand Duchy of Saxe-Weimar-Eisenach